The Senior women's race at the 1994 IAAF World Cross Country Championships was held in Budapest, Hungary, at the Kincsem Park on March 26, 1994.  A preview on the event was given in The Herald, and a report in The New York Times.

Complete results, medallists, and the results of British athletes were published.

Race results

Senior women's race (6.22 km)

Individual

Teams

Note: Athletes in parentheses did not score for the team result

Participation
An unofficial count yields the participation of 148 athletes from 36 countries in the Senior women's race.  This is in agreement with the official numbers as published.

 (4)
 (4)
 (4)
 (1)
 (4)
 (5)
 (4)
 (1)
 (1)
 (1)
 (1)
 (6)
 (6)
 (6)
 (4)
 (6)
 (6)
 (6)
 (4)
 (6)
 (6)
 (6)
 (1)
 (2)
 (6)
 (6)
 (6)
 (1)
 (1)
 (6)
 (6)
 (3)
 (5)
 (6)
 (6)
 (1)

See also
 1994 IAAF World Cross Country Championships – Senior men's race
 1994 IAAF World Cross Country Championships – Junior men's race
 1994 IAAF World Cross Country Championships – Junior women's race

References

Senior women's race at the World Athletics Cross Country Championships
IAAF World Cross Country Championships
1994 in women's athletics